Košarkaški klub Crnokosa is a men's professional basketball club based in Kosjerić, Serbia. The club currently plays in the First Regional Basketball League.

History
It was founded in 1982 and has won no championships since then.

Players

Coaches 

  Dragan Marinković

See also 
 2013–14 Basketball League of Serbia

External links
 Official Website of Serbian Basketball League

Basketball teams in Serbia
Basketball teams in Yugoslavia
Basketball teams established in 1982
1982 establishments in Yugoslavia